Greg Fraine (born 12 October 1962) is a New Zealand cyclist. He competed in the team time trial at the 1988 Summer Olympics.

References

External links
 

1962 births
Living people
New Zealand male cyclists
Olympic cyclists of New Zealand
Cyclists at the 1988 Summer Olympics
Cyclists from Sydney
Commonwealth Games medallists in cycling
Commonwealth Games silver medallists for New Zealand
Cyclists at the 1986 Commonwealth Games
Medallists at the 1986 Commonwealth Games